Shchaslyvtseve is a village in southern Ukraine. The community is located on the Arabat Spit and is geographically in Crimea, but administered as part of Henichesk Raion, Kherson Oblast. It belongs to Henichesk urban hromada, one of the hromadas of Ukraine. 

Shchaslyvtseve is about 15 km south of Henichesk, administrative center of the district within which Shchaslyvtseve is located. Its position on the spit gives it easy access to the Sea of Azov.

The community is considered a resort village and boasts a thermal spring. Its population is about 1,500 people.

References

Villages in Henichesk Raion
Spa towns in Ukraine